SIC Mulher (lit. SIC Woman) is a Portuguese basic cable and satellite television channel owned by Sociedade Independente de Comunicação (SIC) and launched on March 8, 2003. Its target audience are women.

Programming

Alas Smith and Jones
America's Next Top Model
Animal Hospital
Crossing Jordan
Desperate Housewives
Dharma & Greg
Dr. Phil
Everybody Loves Raymond
Home and Away
Hotel Babylon
Northern Exposure
Project Runway
Queer Eye for the Straight Guy
Satisfaction
Sex and the City
Strong Medicine
Teachers
The Biggest Loser
The Block
The Commander
The Division
The Dr. Oz Show
The Ellen DeGeneres Show
The Jay Leno Show
The King of Queens
The Martha Stewart Show
The Oprah Winfrey Show
The Rachel Zoe Project
The Tyra Banks Show
What Not to Wear
Will & Grace

External links
SIC Mulher 

Television stations in Portugal
Portuguese-language television stations
Women's interest channels
Television channels and stations established in 2003
2003 establishments in Portugal
Sociedade Independente de Comunicação